The cycling competition at the 1936 Summer Olympics consisted of two road cycling events and four track cycling events, all for men only.

Medal summary

Road cycling

Track cycling

Participating nations
175 cyclists from 30 nations competed.

Medal table

References

 
1936 Summer Olympics events
1936
1936 in road cycling
1936 in track cycling
1936 in cycle racing